Sherry Hormann (born 20 April 1960) is a German-American film director. Hormann is best known for her movies Guys and Balls (2004), Desert Flower (2009) and 3096 Days (2013).

Hormann was born in the United States, but moved to Germany in 1966, when she was six years old. She attended the University of Television and Film Munich (HFF) and mainly works in German cinema.

She was married to film director Dominik Graf. In October 2011, she married cinematographer Michael Ballhaus; he died in April 2017.

Selected filmography
 1994: Frauen sind was Wunderbares
 1996: Father's Day
 1998: Widows – Erst die Ehe, dann das Vergnügen
 1998:  – Angst spür’ ich, wo kein Herz ist (TV documentary series episode)
 2001: Private Lies (TV film)
 2002: My Daughter's Tears (TV film)
 2004: Guys and Balls
 2006: Helen, Fred und Ted (TV film)
2006–2007: Der Kriminalist (TV series) 
 Am Abgrund (2006)
 Mördergroupie (2006)
 Totgeschwiegen (2007)
2009: Desert Flower
2012: 
2013: 3096 Days
2016: Tödliche Geheimnisse (TV film)
2019: A Regular Woman

References

External links 
 

1960 births
Living people
German film directors
German women film directors
German television directors
American emigrants to Germany
Women television directors